Patrick John Murdoch (10 June 1850 – 1 July 1940) was a Scottish-Australian Presbyterian minister, known for being the father of Keith Murdoch and the grandfather of Rupert Murdoch.

Life

Murdoch was born on 10 June 1850 in the Free Church manse at Pitsligo in Aberdeenshire, the son of Rev James Murdoch (1817–1884) and Helen Garden.

He studied at the University of Aberdeen graduating MA in 1870 and then studied Divinity at New College, Edinburgh and was licensed to preach by the Free Church of Scotland in September 1876.

He acted as an assistant at the Scots Church in Regent Square in London and at Aberdeen South Free Church before being ordained as a minister at Cruden in 1878. 

In 1884, he emigrated to the Colony of Victoria with his parents (James and Helen Murdoch) and his wife Annie.

After three years at West Melbourne Presbyterian Church, Murdoch was called to Trinity Church, Camberwell, where he served from 1887 to 1928. He also served as moderator of the Presbyterian Church of Victoria in 1898–99 and Moderator General of the Presbyterian Church of Australia in 1905–06.

Murdoch was also Clerk of the Presbytery of Melbourne South in from 1896 to 1920. During the Ronald v. Harper slander and libel case in 1909, he refused to produce a letter which was in the presbytery's possession, and spent a night in gaol for contempt of court. William Gray Dixon suggested some twenty years later that this incident demonstrated how the Presbyterian Church of Australia "maintains her traditional spirit of independence".

He died on 1 July 1940 in Hawthorn, Victoria.

Family

In June 1882 he married Annie Brown (1856–1945) at Longhaven House, in Cruden near Aberdeen.

Their five sons included Sir Keith Arthur Murdoch (father of Rupert Murdoch) and World war I veteran Ivon Murdoch.

See also
Murdoch family

References

1850 births
1940 deaths
People from Aberdeen
Alumni of the University of Aberdeen
19th-century Ministers of the Free Church of Scotland
Patrick John
Scottish emigrants to colonial Australia
Australian Presbyterian ministers